The 2009 Saint Francis Cougars football team represented the University of Saint Francis, located in Fort Wayne, Indiana, in the 2009 NAIA football season. They were led by head coach Kevin Donley, who served his 12th year as the first and only head coach in the history of Saint Francis football.  The Cougars played their home games at Bishop John D'Arcy Stadium and were members of the Mid-States Football Association (MSFA) Mideast League (MEL). The Cougars finished tied for 2nd place in the MSFA MEL division; they missed the postseason NAIA playoffs for only second time in the team's history.

Schedule 
(7-3 overall, 5-2 conference)

The 2009 season saw the first home loss since the last game of 2001 in a November 7 defeat by St. Xavier.  Over that time period, the Cougars won 56 consecutive home games.  It also marked the first time the Cougars were not in the NAIA postseason playoff since their inaugural 1998 season.

Ranking movements

References

Saint Francis
Saint Francis Cougars football seasons
Saint Francis Cougars football